The Island of Dreams is a 1925 German silent film directed by Paul L. Stein and starring Liane Haid, Harry Liedtke, and Alfons Fryland.

The film's sets were designed by the art director Walter Reimann.

Cast

References

Bibliography

External links

1925 films
Films of the Weimar Republic
German silent feature films
Films directed by Paul L. Stein
UFA GmbH films
German black-and-white films